Not Without Gisela is a 1951 West German musical comedy film directed by Hans Deppe and starring Peter Mosbacher, Eva Ingeborg Scholz and Hilde Sessak. It was shot at the Spandau Studios in West Berlin and on location around the city. The film's sets were designed by the art director Emil Hasler.

Synopsis
A young inventor who believes he can radically improve television faces some difficulties, but is assisted by the reporter Gisela who does much to refine and promote his project.

Cast
 Peter Mosbacher as Robert Halm
 Horst Gentzen as Sein Freund Pitt
 Eva Ingeborg Scholz as Gisela Düren, eine junge Studentin
 Edith Schneider as Trixi
 Hilde Sessak as Melanie, Tänzerin
 Aribert Wäscher as Mertens, Finanzier
 Paul Heidemann as Hartwig – Regisseur
 Werner Finck as Werner Finck
 Paul Wagner as Direktor Brennert
 Kurt Vespermann as Prokurist Braun
 Ann Höling as Dore – ihre Freundin
 Alexa von Porembsky as Lottchen Zwieback
 Hans Leibelt as Bankier Werner
 Olga Limburg as Seine Mutter
 Rolf Weih as Ricardo
 Otto Braml as Dr. Schreiber – Lawyer
 Werner Schott as Chefredakteur
 Christiane Jansen as Marion
 Liselotte Köster as Sohn & Ballettteil
 Jockel Stahl as Vater & Balletteil
 Das Ballett der Städtischen Oper Berlin as Ballett
 Erwin Bredow as Ballett
 Maria Corelli as Opern-Teil: Sängerin
 Diana Eustrati as Opernteil: Sängerin
 Gerhard Frei as Opernteil: Sänger
 Maria Fris as Ballett
 Paul Schmidtmann as Opernteil: Sänger
 Rudolf Schock as Opernteil: Sänger
 Rita Streich as Opernteil: Sängerin
 Margo Ufer as Ballett
 Hans Wocke as Opernteil: Sänger

References

Bibliography 
 Gerhard Bliersbach. So grün war die Heide: der deutsche Nachkriegsfilm in neuer Sicht. Beltz, 1985.

External links 
 

1951 films
West German films
German musical comedy films
1951 musical comedy films
1950s German-language films
Films directed by Hans Deppe
German black-and-white films
1950s German films
Films shot in Berlin
Films shot at Spandau Studios